Panzertruppenschule II (Armoured Troops School No.2) was the second of two major schools set up by the German Panzerwaffe in World War II to train German armour officers to operate Panzers. It was based in Wünsdorf, Germany.

The Panzertruppenschule was a 'branch school', where officer candidates were sent after 12–16 weeks spent in basic training, and having successfully undertaken an 8-week course at a Kriegsschule.

Prospective panzer troops, known as Fähnrich undertook a 16-week training course which aimed to familiarise the officer candidates with the nuances and workings of a Panzer, and also with the tactics to be used when commanding panzers in the field.

Upon graduation, the recruit was promoted to Oberfähnrich and sent on field probation.

The Instructors were chosen because of their skill, and many had seen action and received decorations.

In late 1943, the school was stripped of its experienced instructors, who were used to form the élite Panzer-Lehr-Division.

See also
 Panzertruppenschule I, Panzer-Lehr-Division, Panzertruppenschule Kama

German panzer divisions